Sobha Realty (Arabic: شوبا العقارية) is a rapid transit station on the Red Line of the Dubai Metro in Dubai. It opened on 30 April 2010 as Dubai Marina and part of the extension to Ibn Battuta.

Location
It lies to the east of the northern half of the Dubai Marina and to the west of the northern portion of Jumeirah Lake Towers.

Nearby development
Originally named Dubai Marina, the station was named after the development of the same name, one of the largest projects in Dubai. Upon completion, the Dubai Marina will house around 120,000 residents around the world's largest artificial marina. Also nearby are the Jumeirah Lake Towers and The Meadows developments.

The station was renamed DAMAC Properties on 19 September 2014. The station was renamed to Dubai Marina on 24 November 2020 (again).

On 9 August 2021, this station was renamed as Sobha Realty.

Station layout
Sobha Realty station lies on a viaduct paralleling the eastern side of Sheikh Zayed Road. It is categorised as a type 2 elevated station, indicating that there is an elevated concourse between street and platform level. Pedestrian access to the station is aided through walkways above Sheikh Zayed Road, connecting to developments on either side of the road.

Platform layout

References

Dubai Metro stations
Railway stations in the United Arab Emirates opened in 2010